The 1996 Mr. Olympia contest was an IFBB professional bodybuilding competition held on September 21, 1996, at the Arie Crown Theater in Chicago, Illinois, United States of America.

Results
The total prize money awarded was $275,000.

Notable events
Dorian Yates won his fifth consecutive Mr. Olympia title
Nasser El Sonbaty came in third in scoring, but was disqualified for testing positive for a banned diuretics drug

References

External links 
 Mr. Olympia

 1996
Mr. Olympia
Mr. Olympia
Mr. Olympia